The Triomphant was a ship of the line of the French Royal Navy. One of two sisterships designed and built by Laurent Hubac (the other was the Belliqueux). Started as Brave in Brest and launched on 20 June 1675, she was renamed Constant six days later, and completed in 1676; she was renamed Triomphant on 28 June 1678. She took part in the Battle of Beachy Head on July 10, 1690, and in the Battle of Barfleur on May 29, 1692.

Following the latter battle, she retreated in a battered condition to Cherbourg, along with two larger warships - the Soleil Royal and Admirable. There the three ships were attacked by English warships on 1 June 1692. This attack was beaten off, but on the following day the English employed fireships and the Admirable was set alight and burnt by the English fireship HMS Woolf.

Sources and references 

Nomenclature des Vaisseaux du Roi-Soleil de 1661 a 1715. Alain Demerliac (Editions Omega, Nice – various dates).
The Sun King's Vessels (2015) - Jean-Claude Lemineur; English translation by François Fougerat. Editions ANCRE.  
Winfield, Rif and Roberts, Stephen (2017) French Warships in the Age of Sail 1626-1786: Design, Construction, Careers and Fates. Seaforth Publishing. . 

Ships of the line of the French Navy
1670s ships
Ships built in France